Odo Noforija is a small community close to Imokun (SHIRAYE) in the Epe local government area of Lagos State, Nigeria. Just as in Epe local government, the main source of livelihood here is fishing. Men and women alike go fishing and trade their spoils. People travelled from the main city of Lagos to buy very fresh and considerably cheap fish.
It is an ancient town which was settled in by Gbelebuwa the First (the prince of the Awujale of Ijebu Ode). The traditional ruler in the community is called the Aladeshonyin. The present Aladeshonyin is His Royal Majesty Oba Dr. Babatunde Ola. OGUNLAJA (Jp. Hons. FMBE)

In the early twentieth century, the Ogunyeade Adebajo family which is a notable family settled down in this region from the Isale Eko area in Lagos State. Moses Adelekan Ogunyeade Adebajo and his wives continued their generations from there. Unlike the predominantly Muslim community in Epe local government, he was a Christian descending from Isale Eko and brought up his family in the Christian faith.

His grandson, Israel Adebayo Adebajo become the founder of the popular Stationery Stores Football club ("Adebajo Babes") based in Lagos, Nigeria.

Populated places in Lagos State
Communities in Yorubaland